"We Don't Have to Take Our Clothes Off" (released in the United Kingdom as "We Don't Have To...") is a song by American R&B singer Jermaine Stewart, released in 1986 as the lead single from his second studio album Frantic Romantic (1986). The song was written by Narada Michael Walden and Preston Glass, and produced by Walden. "We Don't Have to Take Our Clothes Off" remains Stewart's biggest commercial success, peaking at number five on the Billboard Hot 100. It also peaked within the top ten of the charts in Canada, Ireland, and the United Kingdom.

Background
Stewart recorded "We Don't Have to Take Our Clothes Off" during 1985 and it was released across the world the following summer. The single seemed to reflect more modesty regarding sex due to the AIDS epidemic at the time. When interviewed by Donnie Simpson in 1988, Stewart spoke of the lyrical message within the song, "I think it made a lot of peoples' minds open up a little bit. We didn't only want to just talk about clothes, we wanted to extend that. We wanted to use the song as a theme to be able to say you don't have to do all the negative things that society forces on you. You don't have to drink and drive. You don't have to take drugs early. The girls don't have to get pregnant early. So the clothes bit of it was to get people's attention, which it did and I'm glad it was a positive message."

The song reignited Stewart's popularity, as his previous single, "I Like It", had failed to make much impact as a follow-up to Stewart's moderately successful debut single, "The Word Is Out" ("I Like It" did not chart in either the US or the United Kingdom).

Promotion
A music video, directed by David Fincher, was created for the single, and Stewart appeared on numerous TV shows to promote the single, including stints on Soul Train and American Bandstand.

Legacy
In 2011, the song was used in a Cadbury's TV commercial in the United Kingdom, called The Charity Shop. This exposed the song to a new generation who downloaded the track and returned it to the UK Singles Chart, peaking at number 29. The song also appeared in Kevin Smith's film Zack and Miri Make a Porno, the episode "My Dirty Secret" of the television show Scrubs, and the first episode of the second series of the comedy show Peter Kay's Car Share.

The song has been covered a number of times, notably by Clea, Lil' Chris, and Ella Eyre.

Release
In the US, "We Don't Have to Take Our Clothes Off" was released with the B-side, "Give Your Love to Me", the closing track from Frantic Romantic, written by Jakko J. and Stewart. In the UK and Europe, the B-side "Brilliance" was taken from Stewart's 1984 debut album The Word Is Out and was written by Stewart and Julian Lindsay. A dance remix of "We Don't Have to Take Our Clothes Off" was made by Lewis A. Martineé.

Formats
7" single (American release)
"We Don't Have to Take Our Clothes Off" – 3:57
"Give Your Love to Me" – 4:20

7" single (Canadian release)
"We Don't Have to Take Our Clothes Off" (short version) – 4:05
"We Don't Have to Take Our Clothes Off" (dub mix) – 6:40

7" single (European release)
"We Don't Have to Take Our Clothes Off" – 4:05
"Brilliance" – 4:43

7" single (UK and Australian release)
"We Don't Have To..." – 4:05
"Brilliance" – 4:43

12" single (American and Canadian release)
"We Don't Have to Take Our Clothes Off" (dance remix) – 5:45
"We Don't Have to Take Our Clothes Off" (dub) – 6:40
"We Don't Have to Take Our Clothes Off" (short version) – 4:05

12" single (European release)
"We Don't Have to Take Our Clothes Off" (extended) – 5:45
"We Don't Have to Take Our Clothes Off" – 4:05
"Brilliance" – 4:43

12" single (UK release)
"We Don't Have To..." (extended version) – 5:45
"We Don't Have To..." – 4:05
"Brilliance" – 4:43

Charts

Original release

2011 reissue

Year-end charts

Certifications

Personnel

Album version
Taken from the Frantic Romantic liner notes.

 Jermaine Stewart – lead vocals
 Narada Michael Walden – Drums, programming (Linn drum machine)
 Greg "Gigi" Gonaway – Simmons drum fills
 Preston "Tiger Head" Glass, Walter "Baby Love" Afanasieff – Keyboards, synthesizer
 Corrado Rustici – guitar
 Randy "The King" Jackson – Moog Source bass synth
 Marc Russo, Premik Russell Tubbs – saxophones
 Jeanie Tracy, Jim Gilstrap, Karen "Kitty Beethoven" Brewington, Laundon Von Kendricks, Sylvester, The Lala Gang (Sudhahota, Anukampa Walden, Carl Lewis, Kim Carter) – backing vocals

Additional personnel on single release
 Art direction – Donn Davenport
 Design – Rebecca Tachna
 Stylist – Jane Hoffman
 Photography – Steve Prezant
 Guitar on "We Don't Have to Take Our Clothes Off" – Chris Amigo
 Keyboards on "We Don't Have to Take Our Clothes Off" – Fro Sossa
 Mix engineer – Mike Couzzi
 Mixer on "We Don't Have to Take Our Clothes Off" – Lewis A. Martineé
 Producer, arranger on "We Don't Have to Take Our Clothes Off" – Narada Michael Walden
 Remixer on "We Don't Have to Take Our Clothes Off" (short version) – Lewis A. Martineé
 Remixer on "We Don't Have to Take Our Clothes Off" (dub mix) – Lewis A. Martineé
 Remixer on "We Don't Have to Take Our Clothes Off" (dance remix) – Lewis A. Martineé
 Producer on "Brilliance" – Peter Collins
 Producer on "Give Your Love to Me" – Narada Michael Walden
 Writers of "We Don't Have to Take Our Clothes Off" – Narada Michael Walden, Preston Glass
 Writers of "Brilliance" – Jermaine Stewart, Julian Lindsay
 Writers of "Give Your Love to Me" – Jakko J., Jermaine Stewart

Clea version

The song was covered by English girl group Clea and was released as their third single in the UK in September 2005. It was their third top 40 hit, charting at number 35. The song appears on their UK debut album, Trinity.

Charts

Lil' Chris version

Lil' Chris covered the song and released it as the only single from his second album, What's It All About, on October 19, 2007. It peaked at number 63 on the UK Singles Chart. This was his last single before his death in 2015.

Track listing
CD single
 "We Don't Have to Take Our Clothes Off" – 3:04
 "Taste Me" (live in Manchester)
 "I Never Noticed" (Live in London)

7" vinyl
 "We Don't Have to Take Our Clothes Off" – 3:04
 "We Don't Have to Take Our Clothes Off" (Media Virus Remix) – 5:53

Charts

Ella Eyre version

The song was covered by Ella Eyre and appeared first on Virgin Records: 40 Years of Disruptions, a record released on October 5, 2013, by Virgin Records celebrating 40 years in business. It was later included on her EP Ella Eyre, released February 10, 2015, and finally on the deluxe version of her debut album Feline. The song charted on the UK chart at number 54 and was certified Platinum by the British Phonographic Industry (BPI) in 2022.

Charts

Certifications

Other performances
Calum Scott, a competitor in Britain's Got Talent performed the song in the 2017 semi-finals of the show.
 The Hot Stewards (Currently The Dirty Daddies) covered this song on their 2007 debut album 'Cover Up'

References

1986 songs
1986 singles
2005 singles
2007 singles
Jermaine Stewart songs
Clea (group) songs
Lil' Chris songs
Ella Eyre songs
Songs written by Narada Michael Walden
Song recordings produced by Narada Michael Walden
Songs written by Preston Glass
Virgin Records singles
Arista Records singles
RCA Records singles
Music videos directed by David Fincher